The 2020 Taça 12 de Novembro is the 8th staging of the Taça 12 de Novembro, the football knockout tournament in East Timor.

The draw for the tournament matches was held on November 9.

Preliminary round

Round of 16

Quarter-finals

Semi-finals

Final

References

External links
Facebook page

Taça 12 de Novembro
Timor-Leste
2020 in Timor Leste football